Conus petuchi is a species of sea snail, a marine gastropod mollusc in the family Conidae, the cone snails, cone shells or cones.

These snails are predatory and venomous. They are capable of "stinging" humans.

Description
The size of the shell varies between 28 mm and 33 mm.

Distribution
This marine species occurs in the Atlantic Ocean and is endemic to Angola.

References

 Monteiro A., Afonso C., Tenorio M.J., Rosado J. & Pirinhas D. (2014). New data on the endemic cones (Gastropoda, Conidae) of Angola, with the description of new species. Xenophora Taxonomy. 5: 61-73 page(s): 68, pl. 3 figs 1-7

External links

 To World Register of Marine Species
 

Endemic fauna of Angola
petuchi
Gastropods described in 2014